Alberto Manzano (born 22 September 1972) is a retired Cuban pole vaulter. His personal best jump was 5.45 metres, achieved in July 1990 in Havana.

Career

He won silver medals at the 1993 Central American and Caribbean Games and the 1993 and 1995 Central American and Caribbean Championships, bronze medals at the 1994 IAAF World Cup and the 1995 Pan American Games and a gold medal at the 1997 Central American and Caribbean Championships.

Achievements

References

1972 births
Living people
Cuban male pole vaulters
Athletes (track and field) at the 1995 Pan American Games
Pan American Games medalists in athletics (track and field)
Pan American Games bronze medalists for Cuba
Central American and Caribbean Games silver medalists for Cuba
Competitors at the 1993 Central American and Caribbean Games
Central American and Caribbean Games medalists in athletics
Medalists at the 1995 Pan American Games
20th-century Cuban people
21st-century Cuban people